Statistics of Primera Fuerza in season 1923-24.

Overview
It was contested by 9 teams, and Club España won the championship.

League standings
(All clubs from México City)

Playoff

References
Mexico - List of final tables (RSSSF)

1923-24
Mex
1923–24 in Mexican football